Anthony Wayne Clark (September 15, 1966, in Philippines – May 22, 2005, in Friendswood, Texas, U.S.) was an American powerlifter, holder of the world record for the reverse-grip bench press and member of the York Barbell Hall of Fame.

Powerlifting career
By the time Clark was 13, he was lifting 110-pound cement weights. In 1986, Clark became the first teenager to bench press 600 pounds, and was notable for using a reverse grip on the bar. In 1992, he was the first lifter to bench press 700 using the reverse grip. On September 25, 1993, at the U.S. Powerlifting Federation (USPF) Northwest Open, Clark broke his own world record with a 735 lb lift. In May 1993 he had pressed 725 lb.

After his record-breaking lift, Clark often referred to himself as the World's Strongest Man, and toured for a time performing feats of strength. On one occasion he pushed a 6,000–lb. elephant, in a heavy-duty wheelbarrow, across the floor in a strongman competition in Japan. In addition to that, Clark gave motivational speeches, seminars, and one-on-one counseling to motivate kids and prison inmates to improve their lives. Clark also claimed that he stopped using steroids at the age of 22, stating that all they did was to increase his blood pressure. He called his best friend Big Mike.

At the Arnold Schwarzenegger Classic in 1997, he performed a controversial, reverse-gripped 800-pound bench press,
 which was later turned down. This was more than 2 years before Tim Isaac would break the 800 pound mark at a sanctioned meet.

Personal records
Powerlifting Competition Records

done in official Powerlifting full meets
 Squat – 499 kg (1100 lbs) (in singleply squat suit)
 Bench press – 365 kg (805 lbs) (in bench shirt)
 Deadlift – 350 kg (771 lbs)
 Total – 1179.34 kg (2600 lbs) equipped
→ former IPF world record in SHW class (+regardless of weight class)

Death
Anthony Clark, aged 38, died on May 22, 2005, of a heart attack and subsequent kidney failure and is buried at Forest Park East Cemetery in Webster, Texas.

References

External links
Interview with Antony Clark on bodybuilding.com

1966 births
2005 deaths
American strength athletes
American powerlifters
American sportspeople of Filipino descent
Filipino expatriate sportspeople in the United States